The Asian Hospital and Medical Center, established on 11 May 2002 is the first private tertiary hospital built in the southern part of Metro Manila, with Jorge Garcia, MD, an alumnus of the Faculty of Medicine & Surgery of the University of Santo Tomas, as its founding chairman. It currently stands on a land area within the vicinity of Filinvest Corporate City, Alabang, Muntinlupa, Philippines, measuring  that both includes the main hospital building and the hospital's medical offices.

Awards and certifications
The medical center has been licensed by the Philippine Department of Health and is affiliated with and accredited to the Philippine Health Insurance Corporation (PhilHealth).

It has also been accredited by The Joint Commission International in 2013, 2016, 2019 along with its most recent Gold Seal accreditation in 2022

See also
List of hospitals in the Philippines

References

Buildings and structures in Muntinlupa
Hospital buildings completed in 2002
Hospitals in Metro Manila
Hospitals established in 2002
Anshen and Allen buildings
2002 establishments in the Philippines
21st-century architecture in the Philippines